Piqueriella is a genus of a Brazilian plants in the tribe Eupatorieae within the family Asteraceae. The genus contains a single described species, Piqueriella brasiliensis, found only in the State of Ceará in northeastern Brazil.

References

Endemic flora of Brazil
Monotypic Asteraceae genera
Eupatorieae